Muhammad Izzul Islam bin Mazlan (born 2 June 1989), better known by his stage name Izzue Islam, is a Malaysian actor, singer and host. At the 2013 Malaysia Film Festival, he was awarded in the Most Promising Actor category.

Filmography

Film

Television series

Television movie

Television

Awards and nominations

References

External links 

 

1990 births
Malaysian male actors
Malaysian male pop singers
Living people
People from Kota Bharu